Volodia Teitelboim Volosky (originally Valentín Teitelboim Volosky; March 17, 1916 – January 31, 2008) was a Chilean communist politician, lawyer, and author.

Personal life
Born in Chillán to Jewish immigrants (Ukrainian Moisés Teitelboim and Bessarabian Sara Volosky), Teitelboim was interested in literature from an early age. He finished high school, then began his studies in the Faculty of Law of the University of Chile, where at graduation he presented his senior thesis “The Dawn of Capitalism - The Conquest of America.”

At the age of 29, Teitelboim married Raquel Weitzmann, who had also studied law. In the 1940s, while Teitelboim, like other members of the Communist Party, was forced to go underground, Weitzman became pregnant with the child of a former university colleague.  The child, named Claudio, was adopted by Teitelboim and Weitzman's affair was hushed up. Due to Teitelmboim's frequent long periods of absence due to party activities, persecution, and imprisonment, the marriage suffered, and finally ended in 1957, when Weitzman left for Cuba in company of Jaime Barros.  Teitelboim then took charge of Claudio, who was 10 years old at the time.  When, in 2005, Claudio learned that he had been deceived and that his father was actually the lawyer Álvaro Bunster, he broke relations with Teitelboim and took on his biological father's surname.

Teitelboim's second marriage, at the age of 51, was to Eliana Farías. Together, while in exile in Moscow following the Chilean military coup d'état of September 11, 1973, they raised Faría's son, Roberto Nordenflycht, and their own daughter, whom they named Marina. Roberto followed Teitlboim's example and also became a communist.  He was killed in August 1989 while taking part in a guerrilla action in Chile with the Manuel Rodriguez Patriotic Front. The grief over Roberto's death marked the end of Teitelboim's marriage to Farías.  Marina, for her part, eventually became a career diplomat.

Teitelboim died on January 31, 2008, at the Catholic University's hospital in Santiago of kidney failure resulting from lymphatic cancer. He and Claudio Bunster reportedly reconciled at the end.

Political career
Teitelboim joined the Chilean Communist Party's youth section at the age of sixteen.  During the 1940s he endured persecution, along with all the militants of the Communist Party, and was imprisoned in Pisagua under the so-called Democratic Defense Law (also known as Ley maldita, or "cursed law").

In 1961 he was elected to Congress as a Deputy for Valparaíso and Quillota, a post he held until 1965, when he was elected Senator for Santiago.  He was re-elected to this post in March 1973, but was only able to further serve in it until Congress was disbanded following the September 11, 1973, coup d'état.

During the military regime of Gen. Augusto Pinochet Teitelboim lived in exile in Moscow, where he launched the twice-weekly radio program Escucha, Chile ("Listen, Chile").  Despite the risk, he clandestinely returned to Chile in 1988 and campaigned for a provisional government following the regime's having been handed a defeat in that year's national plebiscite. The following year he was elected president of the Communist Party, a position he held until 1994.

Literary work
Teitelboim's literary work, for which he was awarded Chile's National Prize in Literature in 2002, as well as the Literature prize of the 1931 Floral Games, is chiefly in the form of memoirs, biographies, and literary essays.  His first book Antología de poesía chilena (Anthology of Chilean Poetry) was published in conjunction with Eduardo Anguita in 1932, and compiled the great poets of Chile.  He would later say that it committed the errors of omitting Gabriela Mistral and of accentuating the dispute between Vicente Huidobro, Pablo de Rokha, and Pablo Neruda.  His series of memoirs, Un muchacho del siglo XX (A Boy of the Twentieth Century, 1997), La gran guerra de Chile y otra que nunca existió (The Great War of Chile and Another That Never Existed, 2000) and Noches de radio (Radio Nights, 2001) present from a political and social perspective the great arch of Chilean history during the 20th century.  His best known capacity is that of a biographer, in which he wrote about Jorge Luis Borges, Vicente Huidobro, and with the most critical acclaim, Pablo Neruda and Gabriela Mistral.  In terms of membership in literary movements, he is generally located within the Chilean Generation of '38.

List of published works
Antología de poesía chilena (Anthology of Chilean Poetry) - 1935
El amanecer del capitalismo. La conquista de América (The dawn of capitalism.  The conquest of America) - 1943
Hijo del salitre (Son of saltpeter) - 1952
La semilla en la arena. Pisagua (The seed in the sand) - 1957
Hombre y hombre (Man and man) - 1969
El oficio ciudadano (The duty of the citizen) - 1973
El pan de las estrellas (The bread of the stars) - 1973
La lucha continúa, pólvora del exilio (The struggle continue, powder from exile) - 1976
Narradores chilenos del exilio (Chilean storytellers from exile) - 1978
Neruda - 1984
La palabra y la sangre (The word and the blood) - 1986
El corazón escrito (The written heart) - 1986 
En el país prohibido (In the forbidden country) - 1988
Gabriela Mistral, pública y secreta (Gabriela Mistral, public and secret) - 1991
Huidobro, la marcha infinita (Huidobro, the infinite march) - 1993
Los dos Borges (The two Borges) - 1996
Un muchacho del siglo XX (A Boy of the 20th Century) - 1997
Notas de un concierto europeo (Notes from a European concert) - 1997
Voy a vivirme (I am going to live myself) - 1998
La gran guerra de Chile y otra que nunca existió (The great war of Chile and another which never existed) - 2000
Noches de radio (Nights of radio) - 2001
Ulises llega en locomotora (Ulysses arrives in a locomotive) - 2002

References

1916 births
2008 deaths
People from Chillán
Chilean Jews
Chilean people of Ukrainian-Jewish descent
Chilean people of Moldovan-Jewish descent
Communist Party of Chile politicians
Deputies of the XLIV Legislative Period of the National Congress of Chile
Senators of the XLV Legislative Period of the National Congress of Chile
Senators of the XLVI Legislative Period of the National Congress of Chile
Senators of the XLVII Legislative Period of the National Congress of Chile
Chilean male writers
National Prize for Literature (Chile) winners
Chilean expatriates in the Soviet Union
People granted political asylum in the Soviet Union